Solomon Porfirio Ortiz (born June 3, 1937) is an American former politician who served as the U.S. representative for , based in Corpus Christi, serving from 1983 until 2011. He is a member of the Democratic Party. In 2010, Ortiz was narrowly defeated by Republican challenger Blake Farenthold. Ortiz's son, Solomon Ortiz, Jr., is a former state representative.

Early life, education, and business career
Solomon Ortiz was born in Robstown, Nueces County, Texas; his family had immigrated from Mexico. As a boy, he held several odd jobs, including working as a shoeshiner and an ink fogger for The Robstown Record's letter press. Ortiz befriended, and became fascinated with, law enforcement officers. He attended Robstown High School until the age of 19, when he dropped out after his father's death to help support his family.

Ortiz joined the United States Army in 1960, serving two years and earning his GED. He received basic training at Fort Hood, Texas, and served a tour of duty in Verdun and Vitry-le-François, France. Expressing his interest in law enforcement, Ortiz was reassigned to the 61st Military Police Company Criminal Investigation Office and received advanced military police training at Fort Gordon, Georgia.

After returning to South Texas, Ortiz worked for three years as an insurance agent.

Early political career
In 1964, he was urged by friends to run for Nueces County constable, and was elected in 1965, defeating the incumbent in a runoff election. He was elected to the county commissioners court of Nueces County in 1969, the first Hispanic to serve in that capacity. He remained in that position until 1976, when he was elected county sheriff, another first for a Hispanic in Nueces County.

U.S. House of Representatives

Elections
When the 27th District was created in 1982, Ortiz ran for the seat on a platform of jobs incentives and attention to education. He won the Democratic primary run-off election with 52% of the vote, defeating Republican State Representative Joe Salem. In the general election, he won with 64% of the vote.

He won re-election 13 times, dipping below 60% of the vote only four times before 2010. His lowest winning percentage was in 1992, when he defeated Republican Jay Kimbrough 55%-43%.

2010

On November 2, election night, Ortiz appeared to have lost to the Republican challenger, Blake Farenthold, but Ortiz requested a recount. Ortiz conceded after the November 22 recount. Farenthold narrowly defeated him 47.8%-47.1%, by a margin of just 770 votes. While Ortiz had won four of the district's six counties, he lost the two northernmost counties, San Patricio and his home county of Nueces.

Tenure
Ortiz is a Democratic moderate.  He is socially conservative, but economically liberal. For example, he is anti-abortion, but usually voted with his party on economic issues.

Committee assignments
111th Congress

Committee on Armed Services
Subcommittee on Readiness (Chairman)
Subcommittee on Seapower and Expeditionary Forces
Committee on Transportation and Infrastructure
Subcommittee on Aviation
Subcommittee on Highways and Transit
Subcommittee on Water Resources and Environment

Previous committees

In 1983, as a freshman congressman, he was assigned to the U.S. Select Committee on Narcotics Abuse and Control. In 1993, Ortiz was named chairman of a House subcommittee that oversees the Gulf of Mexico.

See also
List of Hispanic and Latino Americans in the United States Congress

References

External links
 
Profile at SourceWatch

|-

|-

1937 births
Living people
21st-century American politicians
American politicians of Mexican descent
American United Methodists
County commissioners in Texas
Del Mar College alumni
Democratic Party members of the United States House of Representatives from Texas
Hispanic and Latino American members of the United States Congress
People from Corpus Christi, Texas
People from Robstown, Texas
Texas sheriffs
United States Army soldiers
Members of Congress who became lobbyists